The Minnesota International Piano-e-Competition was founded in 2002 by Alexander Braginsky in collaboration with the Yamaha Corporation. It took place every two years in Minneapolis–Saint Paul before the 2008 edition was delayed to 2009 due to the arrangement of a junior edition of the competition. The -e- refers to the competition's focus on Internet and Disklavier technologies. The e-competition is one of the biggest, most significant competitions available for young artists. Many of its past competitors have gone on to achieve significant success on the global competition/concert stage.

Prize winners

Senior competition

Junior competition

References

 "Winners of First e-Piano Junior Competition Revealed", press release, Reuters, July 14, 2008.

External links
 International Piano-e-Competition

Piano competitions in the United States